Joshua Marcus Andrew Bassett (born 17 March 1992) is an English rugby union player who currently plays for Harlequins. His regular position is Wing.

Club career

Bassett played youth team rugby for Ampthill RUFC, where he helped the under-17s win the National Bowl with a try in the final—the team lost only one game all season.

Bassett played for Bedford Blues in the RFU Championship.  After being promoted from the academy in 2010, Bassett soon became a regular starter. He was linked with a host of Premiership teams after becoming a prolific try scorer for the Blues.

On 3 April 2013, it was announced that Bassett had signed for Wasps for the 2013/14 season. He would join fellow England U20s such as Tommy Bell, Nathan Morris and Alec Hepburn with whom he played at the 2012 junior World Cup.

Wasps entered administration on 17 October 2022 and Bassett was made redundant along with all other players and coaching staff. Shortly after it was announced that he would join Premiership rivals Harlequins until the end of the season.

On 25 January 2023, Bassett would sign for Premiership rivals Leicester Tigers from the 2023-24 season.

International career
Bassett has made multiple appearances for the England Under 20s side, including a trip to South Africa for the 2012 IRB Junior World Rugby Championship.

In June 2021, Bassett was called up the England Senior Men's training squad for the summer series

References

External links
 Bedford Blues profile
https://web.archive.org/web/20130406144752/http://www.wasps.co.uk/news/wasps33782.ink

1992 births
Living people
Bedford Blues players
Wasps RFC players
Doncaster R.F.C. players
English rugby union players
Rugby union wings
Rugby union players from Luton